Noble Quran may refer to:

Quran, the original Arabic version
Noble Quran (Hilali–Khan), a translation of the Quran by Muhammad Muhsin Khan and Muhammad Taqi-ud-Din al-Hilali